WLR FM, or more commonly WLR (Waterford Local Radio) is the local radio station covering Waterford City and County, Ireland. It is Ireland's Local Station of the Year 2019, 2020, 2021 & 2022. In addition to the official franchise area, the station also enjoys a considerable listenership in South County Kilkenny and East County Cork. Licensed by the Broadcasting Commission of Ireland since 1989, WLR had previously been a pirate radio station.

WLR broadcasts on three frequencies: 95.1 MHz for most of the county (and a low-power transmitter also on 95.1 MHz for Waterford city centre), 97.5 MHz for Waterford city and much of East Waterford, and a low-power transmitter on 94.8 MHz to cover the East Waterford coast.

WLR was announced as Ireland's IMRO Local Station of the Year for the third year in succession in October 2021. IMRO On 1 September 2018 WLR launched a new Country and Irish digital radio station Absolute Irish Radio.

History
The original WLR, which was a pirate station, launched on 23 June 1978 broadcasting from the garage of Rick Whelan at Killotteran just outside the city. This unlicensed operation was one of the longest lasting in the country and continued for just over a decade until its closure at the end of 1988 – new radio licences were to be awarded by the then IRTC (now BCI) in 1989. WLR, with a number of local businessmen on board formed a consortium to apply for the franchise to broadcast to Waterford city and county. This application had competition from two other applicants, one (Deise Broadcasting Company) involved former pirate ABC Radio and local business people including the Reid family (owners of the well-known 'Egans' licensed premises where ABC was based before its closure), and another application (Waterford Radio/WRFM) which was backed by the then Waterford Foods and The Munster Express newspaper. The IRTC held oral hearings for the Waterford licence at the Tower Hotel in Waterford city on 27 April 1989 where all three applicants presented their case. Shortly afterwards it was announced WLR's consortium was victorious. The licensed WLR FM launched on 8 September 1989 from studios on Georges Street above the Georges Court Shopping Centre in Waterford City. The station broadcast from these studios for many years until the building of the present purpose-built Broadcast Centre, at Ardkeen, Waterford. The station's licence has been unchallenged on subsequent renewals.

The station was 75% owned by Thomas Crosbie Holdings until that company went into receivership in March 2013. The 75% stake was acquired by Landmark Media Investments. In December 2017, a sale of the 75% stake to The Irish Times was agreed pending regulatory approval. In July 2018, the sale of the station to The Irish Times was complete.

Studios
The station has purpose built studios at "The Broadcast Centre", Ardkeen, Waterford City (shared with regional youth station Beat 102 103) and at the Dungarvan studio at The Plaza, Dungarvan Shopping Centre. The Broadcast Centre was opened by then Taoiseach Bertie Ahern in 2003 replacing WLR FM's previous studio at Great Georges Street in Waterford City, while the new Dungarvan studio was opened by Head of the BCI Michael O'Keefe (a Dungarvan man) on 10 November 2007 replacing the existing studio at Harbour Bay in the town.

A major studio re-fit has started which will see the 10-studio complex upgraded over a 12-month period. The first studio started in April 2022.

Notable former presenters 
Tony Weldon (2009) – The well known Waterford entertainer from days past was also a presenter on WLR FM for many years, and was known for his catchphrase "get up out of the feathers". His last show, Sunday Morning Melodies, popular with older listeners, ended in 2003. Tributes were paid to him by many WLR FM staff, current and former including Head of Programmes Billy McCarthy and former presenter Eddie Wymberry, as well as by other Waterford entertainers such as Val Doonican when he died on Sunday 29 June 2009.
Billy McCarthy (2016), known as "The Voice of Waterford", died on 20 November 2016 at the age of 62 after a short illness.
Kevin Casey (2017), sports editor known for presenting the sports shows "On The Ball" and "Gaelic Ground". In October 2016, he won a PPI National Radio Award for his programme. He died on 3 January 2017 at the age of 40 after a short illness.
Bob Houston
Eddie Wymberry (2018)
Dermot Graham

Market share

According to the JNLR 2018-1 National Radio Listenership Survey, WLR FM had an weekly audience reach of 64,000 in Q1 2018.

References

External links
 
 WLR FM at Radiowaves.fm
 Waterford Local Radio (Pirate Station) at Radiowaves.fm
 Absolute Irish Radio

Former pirate radio stations
Mass media in Waterford (city)
Radio stations in the Republic of Ireland
Radio stations established in 1989